Soluntum or Solus was an ancient city on the Tyrrhenian coast of Sicily near present-day in the comune of Santa Flavia, Italy. In antiquity, it was originally one of the three chief Phoenician settlements in the island and later flourished in the Greek and Roman periods.

Names

The Punic name of the town was simply Kapara, meaning "Village".

The Greek name appears in surviving coins as Solontînos but appears variously in other sources as Solóeis, Soloûs, and Solountînos. Some scholars contend that Soluntum and Solus were two different cities at close quarters, Soluntum, higher upon the hillside, being a later habitation displacing the earlier settlement of Solus, at a lower elevation.

Geography

It is immediately to the east of the bold promontory called Capo Zafferano.

History

From its proximity to Panormus, Soluntum was one of the few colonies that the Phoenicians retained when they gave way before the advance of the Greek colonies in Sicily, and withdrew to the northwest corner of the island. It later passed together with Panormus and Motya into the hands of the Carthaginians, or at least became a dependency of that people. It continued steadfast to the Carthaginian alliance even in 397 BC, when the formidable armament of Dionysius shook the fidelity of most of their allies; its territory was in consequence ravaged by Dionysius, but without effect. At a later period of the war (396 BC) it was betrayed into the hands of that despot, but probably soon fell again into the power of the Carthaginians. It was certainly one of the cities that usually formed part of their dominions in the island; and in 307 BC it was given up by them to the soldiers and mercenaries of Agathocles, who had made peace with the Carthaginians when abandoned by their leader in Africa. During the First Punic War it was still subject to Carthage, and it was not till after the fall of Panormus that Soluntum also opened its gates to the Romans.

It continued to subsist under the Roman dominion as a municipal town, but apparently one of no great importance, as its name is only slightly and occasionally mentioned by Cicero. But it is still noticed both by Pliny and Ptolemy, where the name is corruptly written ), as well as at a later period by the Itineraries, which place it 12 miles from Panormus and 12 from Thermae (modern Termini Imerese). Soluntum minted coins in antiquity. It is probable that its complete destruction dates from the time of the Saracens.

Excavations and remains

Excavations have brought to light considerable remains of the ancient Roman town, and a good deal still remains unexplored. The traces of two ancient roads, paved with large blocks of stone, which led up to the city, may still be followed, and the whole summit of Monte Catalfano is covered with fragments of ancient walls and foundations of buildings. Among these may be traced the remains of two temples, of which some capitals and portions of friezes, have been discovered. An archaic oriental Artemis sitting between a lion and a panther, found here, is in the museum at Palermo, with other antiquities from this site. An inscription, erected by the citizens in honour of Fulvia Plautilla, the wife of Caracalla, was found there in 1857.  With the exception of the winding road by which the town was approached on the south, the streets, despite the unevenness of the ground, which in places is so steep that steps have to be introduced, are laid out regularly, running from east to west and from north to south, and intersecting at right angles. They are as a rule paved with slabs of stone. The houses were constructed of rough walling, which was afterwards plastered over; the natural rock is often used for the lower part of the walls. One of the largest of them, with a peristyle, was in 1911, though wrongly, called the gymnasium. Near the top of the town are some cisterns cut in the rock, and at the summit is a larger house than usual, with mosaic pavements and paintings on its walls. Several sepulchres also have been found.

See also

References

Citations

Bibliography
 
 
 .

External links

 Official website 
 

Ancient cities in Sicily
Archaeological sites in Sicily
Former populated places in Italy
Phoenician colonies in Sicily
Roman towns and cities in Italy
Carthaginian colonies